Neil McCarthy may refer to:

Neil McCarthy (actor) (1933–1985), British actor
Neil McCarthy (basketball) (1940–2021), American college basketball coach
Neil McCarthy (rugby union) (born 1974), English rugby union player
Neil S. McCarthy (1888–1972), American film industry lawyer and racehorse owner/breeder